is a railway station on the Aizu Railway Aizu Line in the city of Aizuwakamatsu, Fukushima Prefecture, Japan, operated by the Aizu Railway.

Lines
Monden Station is served by the Aizu Line, and is located 4.9 rail kilometers from the official starting point of the line at Nishi-Wakamatsu Station.

Station layout
Monden Station has two opposed side platforms connected by a level crossing. There is no station building, but only a shelter by the platform. The station is unattended.

Adjacent stations

History
Monden Station opened on November 1, 1927.

Surrounding area

See also
 List of railway stations in Japan

External links
  Aizu Railway Station information 

Railway stations in Fukushima Prefecture
Aizu Line
Railway stations in Japan opened in 1927
Aizuwakamatsu